Soerjadi Soedirdja (11 October 1938 – 3 August 2021) was an Indonesian politician and military general.

He was Governor of Jakarta from 1992 to 1997 and also Minister of Home Affairs from 1999 to 2001.

Career

Governor of Jakarta
During his leadership, he made projects to build flats , create green areas , and also increase water catchment areas . The subway and triple decker projects that had been touted at the time have not materialized. He succeeded in freeing the streets of Jakarta from pedicab transportation , a program that had been started since the previous governor ( Bang Wi ). In addition, the 27 July 1996 incident occurred during the Jakarta period under his leadership.

In addition, Soerjadi also implemented a One Way System (SSA) on a number of roads. To support the rate of mobility of Jakarta's population, the central government and regional governments as well as the private sector have built a number of toll roads, namely the Inner City Toll Road, the Outer Ring Road Toll Road, the Airport Toll Road, as well as the Jakarta-Cikampek, Jakarta-Bogor-Ciawi and Jakarta-Merak toll roads, which connecting Jakarta with the surrounding cities.

Soerjadi also implemented an increase in the discipline and quality of apparatus resources in the Five Guidelines for DKI Jakarta Government Officials. From this program, the Provincial Government of Jakarta received the 'Samya Krida Tata Tenteram Karta Raharja' Award. The award is an appreciation for the highest work results in implementing the 5 Year Development.

References

1938 births
2021 deaths
Indonesian politicians
Governors of Jakarta